Ocee is an unincorporated community in McLennan County in Central Texas. It lies at an elevation of 574 ft (175 m).

References

Unincorporated communities in Texas
Unincorporated communities in McLennan County, Texas